Thioalkalivibrio thiocyanoxidans is a species of alkaliphilic and obligately autotrophic sulfur-oxidizing bacterium. It was first isolated from soda lakes. Its type strain is Arh 2 (= DSM 13532 = JCM 11368).

References

Further reading
 Robb, Frank, et al., eds. Thermophiles: biology and technology at high temperatures. CRC Press, 2007.
 Seckbach, Joseph, Aharon Oren, and Helga Stan-Lotter, eds. Polyextremophiles: life under multiple forms of stress. Vol. 27. Springer, 2013.

External links
 LPSN
 
 Type strain of Thioalkalivibrio thiocyanoxidans at BacDive –  the Bacterial Diversity Metadatabase

Chromatiales